Toombul bus interchange is a bus interchange located on Sandgate Road, Nundah, Brisbane, Queensland, Australia. It is adjacent to the former Toombul Shopping Centre and Toombul railway station. The interchange is an island, similar to an island platform, made up of six bus stops with an extra two stops on Sandgate Road.

Facilities
The interchange is made up of eight bus stops including two on Sandgate Road. The interchange is an island, similar to an island platform, located in the former Toombul Shopping Centre car park, the island is split into two sides the east and west with three bus stops on both sides. Located on the interchange is toilets, vending machines, seats, drinking fountains, bike rack and a rest area for bus drivers.

Bus routes 
The following bus routes services Toombul bus interchange:

References

External links
Translink - Toombul station locality map March 2022

Bus stations in Brisbane
Nundah, Queensland
Toombul, Queensland